Orthoparamyxovirinae is a subfamily of viruses in the family Paramyxoviridae. Most genera in the subfamily belonged to a previous subfamily, Paramyxovirinae, which was abolished in 2015. The current subfamily, with those genera, was established in 2018.

Taxonomy
Aquaparamyxovirus
Ferlavirus
Henipavirus
Jeilongvirus
Morbillivirus
Narmovirus
Respirovirus
Salemvirus

References

External link
 ICTV Report: Paramyxoviridae

Virus subfamilies
Paramyxoviridae